Thomas Flessenkaemper (July 1, 1981 in Leverkusen) is a German classical composer, pianist, organist and Director of Music at Holy Trinity Cathedral, Gibraltar.

Life 
Thomas Flessenkaemper is a graduate of the conservatoires in Frankfurt a. M. and Karlsruhe. As part of his PhD thesis, he dealt with the Historically informed performance of piano playing in the 19th century. After graduating, he began as a répétiteur at the Xinghai Conservatory of Music in Guangzhou, China, and taught piano. 

His preference for the Russian piano music of the Fin de Siècle characterises his repertoire; in particular Sergei Rachmaninov, Alexander Scriabin and Nikolai Medtner. Flessenkaemper has performed as a soloist, chamber music partner and lied accompanist in Germany, Great Britain and China. He was a jury member at the International Irmler Piano Competition initiated by piano-manufacturing company Bluthner and the Franz Schubert Competition in China.

Flessenkaemper's compositional output embraces choral, instrumental, vocal and chamber music works. Some of his choral works have been published by Verlag Singende Gemeinde. His collaboration with the Belgian harpist Paola Chatelle led to a series of compositions for the chromatic harp of the French harp manufacturer Pleyel. He is founder and artistic director of the Amy Woodforde-Finden Music Festival in Hampsthwaite.

Compositions (selection)

Instrumental music 
 Passacaille on a German Christmas carol for piano („In memory of Handel“)
 Valse-Impromptu for piano („In memory of Chopin“)
 Petite Pastoral for pedal-harp
 Toccata for chromatic harp (Pleyel)
 Nocturne for chromatic harp (Pleyel)
 Minuet for piano

Chamber music 
 Impromptu for two violins and piano
 Prussian Suite for recorder, flute and keyboard instrument („In memory of the Old Fritz“)
 Fantasia on the motif of Handel's "For unto us a Child is born" from the Messiah, for recorder, flute and keyboard instrument
 Fantasia on „Silent Night, holy night“ for recorder, flute and keyboard instrument
 Three Rhenish Elegies for harp/piano and woodwinds
 Three Fantasy Pieces for cello and piano
 Bourrée for recorder, flute and keyboard instrument
 Barcarolle for flute and piano
 Nocturne for flute and piano

Vocal compositions 
 Ballad „The Butterfly in the Garden of Eden“ for soprano, flute and piano
„Herz und Herz vereint zusammen“ for medium voice and piano (arrangement of Franz Schubert's Impromptu op. 142, 3; 1st variation)
 Three Hugo songs for high voice and piano: Le papillon et la fleur / La tombe dit à la rose / Le soleil s’est couché ce soir dans les nuées
 Three Brontë songs for low voice and piano: Fall, Leaves, Fall / O come with me (Had there been falsehood in my breast) / She dried her tears
Three Eichendorff songs for high voice and piano: Die Welt ruht still im Hafen / Schöne Fremde / Dein Bildnis wunderselig
Three Pessoa songs for high voice and piano: Mar Português / Não sei quantas almas tenho / Não sou nada
Three Pushkin songs for low voice and piano: Exegi monumentum (Я памятник) / Ein Augenblick (Я помню) / Ich liebte dich (Я вас любил)

Choral works 
 Der Herr segne dich
 Der Herr segne dich (in second edition)
 Ich bin dein Gott
 Stille Nacht, Heilige Nacht
 Gott ist Liebe for SATB and piano
 Kyrie eleison for SATB and organ

CD recordings 
 Licht in dieser Welt. 2005, ISBN 978-3-87753-049-8.
 Wir sind von Gott umgeben. 2007, ISBN 978-3-87753-073-3.
 Lasst uns singen 2. 2016, ISBN 978-3-87753-159-4.

References

External links 
 Website of Thomas Flessenkaemper

1981 births
Living people
21st-century German classical pianists
Musicians from North Rhine-Westphalia
People from Leverkusen
21st-century German composers
21st-century classical composers